Irene Ruhnke (later Sanvitis; March 30, 1920 – July 13, 1999) was an infielder and outfielder who played from  through  in the All-American Girls Professional Baseball League. She was nicknamed ״Ruhnke Dunk״.

Born in Chicago, Illinois, one of 13 siblings, Irene and her sister, Alice (later Mrs. Alice Cygan) started playing baseball when they attended St. Bridget's Catholic School in Bridgeport. They competed against teams throughout the city. They kept playing when they attended Kelly High School. Irene Ruhnke was one of the sixty original founding members of the All-American Girls Professional Baseball League. Thanks to  her defensive versatility and her ability to hit behind the runner, Ruhnke played several positions during her five years in the circuit. She started as a shortstop and outfielder for the Rockford Peaches in 1943, but later in her career she was platooned at second and third base. Her most productive season came in her rookie year, when she posted career numbers in average (.253), runs (54) and slugging (.316).

Following her baseball career, she spent the rest of her life in Rockford, Illinois, where she married and had two sons. She worked as a machine operator for 27 years at J. L. Clark Corp., from which she retired in 1985. She died on July 13, 1999, aged 79, at the Swedish American Hospital in Rockford after a brief illness. She was survived by her two sons, two sisters, a grandson, and two step-grandchildren.

In 1988, Ruhnke became part of Women in Baseball, a permanent display based at the Baseball Hall of Fame and Museum in Cooperstown, New York, which was unveiled to honor the entire All-American Girls Professional Baseball League.

Career statistics
Batting

Fielding

Sources

All-American Girls Professional Baseball League players
Baseball players from Chicago
Sportspeople from Rockford, Illinois
1920 births
1999 deaths
20th-century American women
20th-century American people